Gyromantis occidentalis, commonly known as the eastern bark mantis, is a species of mantis found in Australia.

See also
List of Australian stick insects and mantids
List of mantis genera and species

References

External links
 https://www.ncbi.nlm.nih.gov/Taxonomy/Browser/wwwtax.cgi?id=267197

Nanomantidae
Mantodea of Oceania
Insects of Australia
Endemic fauna of Australia
Insects described in 1918